Matsya was an ancient Indo-Aryan tribe of central South Asia whose existence is attested during the Iron Age. The members of the Matsya tribe were called the Mātsyeyas and were organised into a kingdom called the Matsya kingdom.

Etymology

Location

The kingdom of the Mātsyeyas covered an extensive territory, with the Sarasvatī river and the forests skirting it as its western border, and its southern boundaries being the hills near the Chambal River. The neighbours of the Matsya state were Kuru in the north, and Sūrasena in the east.

The capital of Matsya was Virāṭanagara, which corresponds to the modern-day Bairāṭ.

History

A forest on the banks of the Sarasvatī and a lake were both named after the king Dvaitavana.

Vedic texts such as the  mention the Mātsyeyas along with the Śālva tribe, and the  connects them with the Kuru-Pañcālas.

The later history of Matsya is not known, although the Buddhist  included it among the sixteen s ("great realms"), which were the most powerful states of South Asia immediately before the birth of the Buddha. The Matsya state in the  period archaeologically corresponds to the Northern Black Polished Ware archaeological culture which in the western part of the Gaṅgā-Yamunā Doab region succeeded the earlier Painted Grey Ware culture, and is associated with the Kuru, Pañcāla, Matsya, Surasena and Vatsa s.

Matsya was eventually conquered by the empire of Magadha.

Legacy 
After the Indian independence in 1947, the princely states of Bharatpur, Dholpur, Alwar and Karauli were temporarily put together from 1947 to 1949 as the ″United States of Matsya″, and later in March 1949 after these princely states signed the Instrument of Accession they were merged with the present state of Rajasthan.

The Matsya Festival is held in Alwar every year in the last week of November to celebrate culture and adventure.

See also
 Vedic period
 Janpadas
 Mahajanapadas
 Cemetery H culture
 Painted Grey Ware culture
 Northern Black Polished Ware
 Kingdoms of Ancient India

References

Sources

8th-century BC establishments in India
4th-century BC disestablishments
Rigvedic tribes
Mahajanapadas
Regions of Haryana
Regions of Rajasthan
Former kingdoms